Stevensburg may refer to:

Stevensburg, Virginia, a rural unincorporated community in Culpeper County
Stevensburg, West Virginia, an unincorporated community in Preston County